__notoc__
In mathematics, an algebraic manifold is an algebraic variety which is also a manifold. As such, algebraic manifolds are a generalisation of the concept of smooth curves and surfaces defined by polynomials. An example is the sphere, which can be defined as the zero set of the polynomial  and hence is an algebraic variety. 

For an algebraic manifold, the ground field will be the real numbers or complex numbers; in the case of the real numbers, the manifold of real points is sometimes called a Nash manifold.

Every sufficiently small local patch of an algebraic manifold is isomorphic to km where k is the ground field. Equivalently the variety is smooth (free from singular points). The Riemann sphere is one example of a complex algebraic manifold, since it is the complex projective line.

Examples
Elliptic curves
Grassmannian

See also
Algebraic geometry and analytic geometry

References
  (See also Proc. Internat. Congr. Math., 1950, (AMS, 1952), pp. 516–517.)

External links
K-Algebraic manifold at PlanetMath
Algebraic manifold at Mathworld
Lecture notes on algebraic manifolds
Lecture notes on algebraic manifolds
Algebraic varieties
Manifolds